Mannweiler-Cölln is a municipality in the Donnersbergkreis district, in Rhineland-Palatinate, Germany.

Culture and sights 
 The Protestant Church of Mannweiler-Cölln (built 1860–61)
 Catholic Chapel (Kleiner Böhl 2). Chapel room in old Catholic schoolhouse, made 1741 by conversion of a farmhouse. Timber-framed building with stained-glass, today occasionally used for services
 Randeck Museum (Böhlstraße 5). 
 Ruins of Randeck Castle
 Ruins of the Stolzenburg (in the vicinity)

References

Municipalities in Rhineland-Palatinate
Donnersbergkreis